Timothy Light (born 1938) is an American sinologist who took a Chinese name "黎天睦" (Pinyin: Lí Tíanmù). He was the fourteenth president of Middlebury College, 1990–1991.

A native of Kalamazoo, Michigan, Light is a scholar in East Asian languages and literature. He served as provost of Kalamazoo College prior to his time at Middlebury, and later became a professor of religion and provost at Western Michigan University.

Professional career

Light's academic career began at the Chinese University of Hong Kong, where he held several teaching and administrative positions from 1960 to 1971. He was a faculty member and director of the East Asia Study Center at the University of Arizona between 1974 and 1980.

Light was a professor and chairperson of the Department of East Asian Languages and Literature at Ohio State University from 1980 to 1986, when he was named provost and professor of linguistics and Asian studies at Kalamazoo College. He went on to serve as acting president at Kalamazoo College in 1989–90, and then served for a year as president of Middlebury College before coming to Western Michigan University to serve as provost. He stepped down from that post in 2000 to pursue his academic work.

Light is currently a Professor Emeritus of Chinese Religion at Western Michigan University.

Political Involvement
Light has contributed money to Democratic candidates and causes including $75,000 to Michigan State Representative Robert Jones' PAC.

See also
Light (surname)

References

1938 births
Living people
Kalamazoo College
Presidents of Middlebury College
Western Michigan University faculty